The Royal Far West Children's Health Scheme operated a number of railway carriages in New South Wales, Australia as Baby Health Clinics. These were attached to regular passenger and goods trains for movement between stations in the western regions of the state.

The first carriage was made available for their use in 1931 and the last survivor was taken out of traffic in 1975. All vehicles were converted by the New South Wales Government Railways from obsolete passenger carriages.

References

Healthcare in Australia
Medical and health organisations based in Australia
Railway coaches of New South Wales